Dolno Spanchevo is a village in Petrich Municipality, in Blagoevgrad Province, Bulgaria. As of 2013, it had a population of 106.

History
The church "Saint George" was built in 1859.

The "La Macédoine et sa Population Chrétienne" survey by Dimitar Mishev concluded that the Christian population in Dolno-Spantchovo in 1905 was composed of 200 Bulgarian Exarchists.

References

Villages in Blagoevgrad Province